Barry Weldon Ashe (born 1956) is a United States district judge of the United States District Court for the Eastern District of Louisiana.

Biography 

Ashe earned his Bachelor of Arts from Tulane University, summa cum laude, where he was inducted into Phi Beta Kappa and Omicron Delta Kappa, and his Juris Doctor from Tulane University Law School, where he graduated magna cum laude, was inducted into the Order of the Coif, and served as the senior managing editor of the Tulane Law Review.

Upon graduation from law school, he served as a law clerk to Judge Carolyn Dineen King of the United States Court of Appeals for the Fifth Circuit. Prior to enrolling in law school, he served for three years in the United States Navy, where he rose to the rank of lieutenant and received an honorable discharge.

Before becoming a judge, he was a partner in the New Orleans office of Stone Pigman Walther Wittmann L.L.C., where his practice spanned a broad range of complex civil and commercial law matters, in both state and federal courts, at trial and on appeal.

Federal judicial service 

On September 28, 2017, President Donald Trump announced his intent to nominate Ashe to an undetermined seat on the United States District Court for the Eastern District of Louisiana. On October 2, 2017, he was officially nominated to the seat vacated by Judge Ivan L. R. Lemelle, who assumed senior status on June 29, 2015.

On January 3, 2018, his nomination was returned to the President under Rule XXXI, Paragraph 6 of the United States Senate. On January 5, 2018, President Donald Trump announced his intent to renominate Ashe to a federal judgeship. On January 8, 2018, his renomination was sent to the Senate. A hearing on his nomination before the Senate Judiciary Committee was held on January 10, 2018. On February 8, 2018, the Senate Judiciary Committee voted to recommend Ashe's nomination by a 20–1 vote. On August 28, 2018, his nomination was confirmed by a voice vote. He received his judicial commission on August 30, 2018.

Memberships 

He has been a member of the New Orleans chapter of the Federalist Society since 2006.

References

External links 
 

1956 births
Living people
20th-century American lawyers
21st-century American lawyers
21st-century American judges
Federalist Society members
Judges of the United States District Court for the Eastern District of Louisiana
Lawyers from New Orleans
Loyola University New Orleans faculty
Tulane University alumni
Tulane University Law School alumni
United States district court judges appointed by Donald Trump
United States Navy officers